Dog booties, commonly called booties, are rubber, fabric, or plastic coverings for dogs' paws used to protect the animal from cold weather, rough terrain, or injury. They are analogous to human shoes and are most common in sled dog races. Many races require booties as a basic element of dog care. The Yukon Quest Sled Dog Race for example, requires mushers to carry no fewer than eight booties per dog.

Many dogs are resistant to wearing booties, and the velcro straps typically used to secure booties often are inadequate on active dogs. During the Yukon Quest, a musher will change between 2,000 and 3,000 booties during the course of the race. Changing booties is necessary when they become wet or fly off a dog's paws. Sometimes, dog booties are worn for hiking, especially on rocky ground.

Like shoes, booties wear out with use. In long sled dog races or over an extended period of time, booties need to be replaced due to wear.

References 

Dog equipment
Dog sledding